Ectohomoeosoma is a genus of snout moths. It was described by Roesler in 1965, and is known from Hungary. It contains the species E. kasyellum. It is found in Austria, Slovakia, Hungary and Romania.

References

Phycitini
Monotypic moth genera
Moths of Europe
Pyralidae genera